This is a list of rivers in Panama.

By drainage basin
This list is arranged by drainage basin, with respective tributaries indented under each larger stream's name.

Caribbean Sea, Atlantic Ocean

Sixaola River
Yorkin River
San Carlos River
Changuinola River
Sini River
Teribe River
Tigre River
Quebrada El Mono
Quebrada Carbon
Quebrada Junco
Guariviara River
Cricamola River
 60km information gap
Calovebora River
 75km information gap
Cocle del Norte River
Toabré River
 Miguel de La Borda
Indio River
 Lagarto
Chagres River
Gatún River
Cascajal River (associated to Portobelo)
Nombre de Dios River
Mandinga
Cangandi River
 200km information gap to the Colombian border.

Pacific Ocean

Guanábano
Corotú
Rabo de Puerco
San Bártolo
Palo Blanco
Colorado
Chiriquí Viejo River
Duablo
Platanal
 Río Chico
Piedra
Chiriquí Nuevo River
David River
Majagua River
Caldera River
 Chorcha
 Las Vueltas
 Estero de Ajo
 Fonseca
 San Juan
 Jocoy
San Felix River
Piedra
Santiago
Tabasara River
Lobaina
Cate
San Pablo River
Cobre River
San Pedro
 Río Martín Grande
 Piña
 Ponuga
Suay
 Mariato
 Palo Seco
 a further lot of minor rivers in the Azuero Peninsula
La Villa River
Parita
Santa Maria River
Pocrí
Grande River
Chico River
 Caño
Cocle del Sur River
 Rio Hondo
 Anton River
 Farallon
 Chame
 Caimito
Cabra
Pacora River
Chepo River (Bayano River)
Mamoní River
Congo River
Santa Barbara
Sabanas River
Lara River
Tuira River
Chucunaque River
 Río Chico
Balsas River
Sambú River
Jaqué River

Coiba Island
the island has 5 rivers flowing separately into the Pacific Ocean.

See also
 List of rivers of the Americas by coastline

References

Rand McNally, The New International Atlas, 1993.
CIA map, 1995.
Openstreetmap
, GEOnet Names Server

Panama
Rivers
Panama